Spider-Man is a Marvel Comics superhero.

Spider-Man or Spiderman may also refer to:

Marvel Entertainment

Characters 

 List of incarnations of Spider-Man

 Alternative versions of Spider-Man

Comics 

 Spider-Man,  also known as Peter Parker: Spider-Man, multiple comic series

Film
 Spider-Man (1969 film), an unauthorized fan film by Donald F. Glut
 Spider-Man (1977 film), a theatrically released pilot for the 1970s US live-action series The Amazing Spider-Man
 Spider-Man (1978 film), a Japanese film connected to the Japanese live-action series
 Spider-Man, a live-action film trilogy by Sam Raimi, starring Tobey Maguire (2002-2007)
 Spider-Man (2002 film), the first film in the series

Television
 Spider-Man (1967 TV series), an US-Canadian animated series that aired 1967–1970
 Spider-Man (Japanese TV series), a Japanese live-action tokusatsu series that aired 1978–1979
 Spider-Man (1981 TV series), an US animated series that aired 1981–1982
 Spider-Man (1994 TV series), also known as Spider-Man: The Animated Series, an US animated series that aired from 1994–1998
 Spider-Man, also known as Spider-Man: The New Animated Series, an US-Canadian CGI-animated series that aired in 2003
 Spider-Man (2017 TV series), an American animated series that aired from 2017-2020

Video games 
 Spider-Man (1982 video game), a game for the Atari 2600
 Spider-Man: The Video Game, a 1991 arcade title from Sega
 Spider-Man (1995 video game), a title from Acclaim
 Spider-Man (2000 video game), a title released by Activision
 Spider-Man (2002 video game), an Activision title based on the movie
 Spider-Man (Insomniac Games series), 2018-
 Spider-Man (2018 video game), also known as Marvel's Spider-Man, the first game in the series

Music
 Spider-Man (soundtrack), the soundtrack album for the 2002 film
 "Spider-Man" (theme song), theme song for the 1967 series
 Spider Man (album), a 1965 album by jazz vibraphonist Freddie McCoy

Manga
 The Spider-Man, a mythical being in the "Turnabout Gallows" arc of the first volume of the Phoenix Wright: Ace Attorney manga series by Kodansha Comics.

Novel 
 The Spider Man, a novel by Filipino author F. Sionil José

People
 Spider-Man (nickname), a list of people

See also 

 List of Spider-Man titles
 Spider-Man in other media
 Spider-Man in film
 Spider-Man in television
 List of video games featuring Spider-Man
 Spider-Man 2 (disambiguation)
 Spider-Man 3 (disambiguation)
The Amazing Spider-Man, the main Spider-Man comic book published since 1963
The Amazing Spider-Man (disambiguation)
 The Amazing Spider-Man 2 (disambiguation)